Ramona Park Historic District is a national historic district located in the northwest quadrant of Rochester in Monroe County, New York. The district consists of 40 contributing buildings.  The garden apartment complex was originally built in 1947 as part of the Rochester Plan to provide quality, low rent housing for veterans returning from World War II and their families.  There are 34 two story garden style apartment buildings and two groups of garage units.  There are a total of 136 apartments, or four per building, with the buildings grouped in 10 clusters. The buildings are in a vernacular Colonial Revival style.  It is one of three complexes built as part of the Rochester Plan; the others are Fernwood Park and Norton Village.

It was listed on the National Register of Historic Places in 2010.

Gallery

References

External links

Residential buildings on the National Register of Historic Places in New York (state)
Colonial Revival architecture in New York (state)
Historic districts in Rochester, New York
Historic districts on the National Register of Historic Places in New York (state)
National Register of Historic Places in Rochester, New York